Ufford Bridge railway station was a station serving the villages of Ufford and Southorpe in the Soke of Peterborough (now part of Cambridgeshire). The station was situated where the road from Ufford crosses the railway, at the point where it meets the Barnack to Southorpe road.

The platform was under and to the north of the bridge and the goods siding to the south. A waiting room was built utilising the road bridge as its roof. The train guard combined the duties of station master, porter, booking clerk and ticket collector at Ufford Bridge.

The station was on the Stamford and Essendine Railway line from Stamford to Wansford line which never really recovered from the 1926 general strike, and the station closed with the line on 1 July 1929.

References

Disused railway stations in Cambridgeshire
Former Great Northern Railway stations
Transport in Peterborough
Buildings and structures in Peterborough
Railway stations in Great Britain opened in 1867
Railway stations in Great Britain closed in 1929